Dynamic tonality is a paradigm for tuning and timbre which generalizes the special relationship between just intonation and the harmonic series to apply to a wider set of pseudo-just tunings and related pseudo-harmonic timbres.

The main limitation of Dynamic Tonality is that it is best used with compatible isomorphic keyboard instruments and compatible synthesizers or with voices and instruments whose sounds are transformed in real time via compatible digital tools.

The static timbre paradigm

Harmonic timbres
A vibrating string, a column or air, and the human voice all emit a specific pattern of partials corresponding to the harmonic series. The degree of correspondence varies, depending on the physical characteristics of the emitter. "Partials" are also called "harmonics" or "overtones." Each musical instrument's unique sound is called its timbre, so an instrument's timbre can be called a "harmonic timbre" if its partials correspond closely to the harmonic series.

Just tunings
Just intonation is a system of tuning that adjusts a tuning's notes to maximize their alignment with a harmonic timbre's partials. This alignment maximizes the consonance of music's tonal intervals.

Temperament
The harmonic series and just intonation share an infinitely-complex—i.e., rank-∞—pattern that is determined by the infinite series of prime numbers. A temperament is an attempt to reduce this complexity by mapping this rank-∞ pattern to a simpler—i.e., lower rank—pattern.

Throughout history, the pattern of notes in a tuning could be altered (that is, "tempered") by humans but the pattern of partials sounded by an acoustic musical instrument was largely determined by the physics of their sound production. The resulting misalignment between "pseudo-just" tempered tunings and untempered timbres made temperament "a battleground for the great minds of Western civilization." This misalignment, in any tuning that is not fully Just (and hence infinitely complex), is the defining characteristic of the Static Timbre Paradigm.

Instruments
Many of the pseudo-just temperaments proposed during this "temperament battle" were rank-2 (two-dimensional)—such as quarter-comma meantone—that provided more than 12 notes per octave. However, the standard piano-like keyboard is only rank-1 (one-dimensional), affording at most 12 notes per octave. Piano-like keyboards affording more than 12 notes per octave were developed by Vicentino, Colonna, Mersenne, Huygens, and Newton, but were deemed cumbersome and difficult to learn.

The dynamic tonality paradigm
The goal of Dynamic Tonality is to enable consonance beyond the range of tunings and temperaments in which harmonic timbres have traditionally been played. Dynamic Tonality delivers consonance by tempering the intervals between notes (into "pseudo-just tunings") and also tempering the intervals between partials (into "pseudo-harmonic timbres") through digital synthesis and/or processing. Aligning the notes of a pseudo-just tuning's notes and the partials of a pseudo-harmonic timbre (or vice versa) enables consonance.

The defining characteristic of Dynamic Tonality is that a given rank-2 temperament (as defined by a period α, a generator β, and a comma sequence) is used to generate, in real time during performance, the same set of intervals among:
 A pseudo-just tuning's notes;
 A pseudo-harmonic timbre's partials; and
 An isomorphic keyboard's  note-controlling buttons.

Generating all three from the same temperament solves two problems and creates (at least) three opportunities.
 Dynamic Tonality solves the problem of maximizing the consonance of tempered tunings, and extends that solution across a wider range of tunings than were previously considered to be consonant.
 Dynamic Tonality solves the "cumbersome" problem cited by Isacoff by generating a keyboard that is (a) isomorphic with its temperament (in every octave, key, and tuning), and yet is (b) tiny (the size of the keyboards on squeezeboxes such as concertinas, bandoneons, and bayans). The creators of Dynamic Tonality could find no evidence that any of Isacoff's Great Minds knew about isomorphic keyboards or recognized the connection between the rank of a temperament and the dimensions of a keyboard (as described in Milne et al. 2007).
 Dynamic Tonality gives musicians the opportunity to explore new musical effects (see "New musical effects," below).
 Dynamic Tonality creates the opportunity for musicians to explore rank-2 temperaments other than the syntonic temperament (such as schismatic, Magic, and miracle) easily and with maximum consonance.
 Dynamic Tonality creates the opportunity for a significant increase in the efficiency of music education.

A rank-2 temperament defines a rank-2 (i.e., two-dimensional) note-space, as shown in Video 1 (Note-space).

The syntonic temperament is a rank-2 temperament defined by its period (just perfect octave, 1/2), its generator (just perfect fifth, 3/2) and its comma sequence (which starts with the syntonic comma, 81/80, which names the temperament). The construction of the syntonic temperament's note-space is shown in Video 2 (Syntonic note-space).

The valid tuning range of the syntonic temperament is show in Figure 1. 

A keyboard that is generated by a temperament is said to be isomorphic with that temperament (from the Greek "iso" meaning "same," and "morph" meaning "shape"). Isomorphic keyboards are also known as generalized keyboards. Isomorphic keyboards have the unique properties of transpositional invariance and tuning invariance when used with rank-2 temperaments of just intonation. That is, such keyboards expose a given musical interval with "the same shape" in every octave of every key of every tuning of such a temperament.

Of the various isomorphic keyboards now known (e.g., the Bosanquet, Janko, Fokker, and Wesley), the Wicki-Hayden keyboard is optimal for dynamic tonality across the entire valid 5-limit tuning range of the syntonic temperament. The isomorphic keyboard shown in this article's videos is the Wicki-Hayden keyboard, for that reason. It also has symmetries related to Diatonic Set Theory, as shown in Video 3 (Same shape). 

The Wicki-Hayden keyboard embodies a tonnetz, as shown in Video 4 (Tonnetz). The tonnetz is a lattice diagram representing tonal space first described by Leonhard Euler in 1739, which is a central feature of Neo-Riemannian music theory.

Non-Western tunings
The endpoints of the valid 5-limit tuning range of the syntonic temperament, shown in Figure 1, are:
 P5=686 (7-TET): The minor second is as wide as the major second, so the diatonic scale is a seven-note whole tone scale. This is the traditional tuning of the traditional Thai ranat ek, in which the ranat's inharmonic timbre is maximally consonant. Other non-Western musical cultures are also reported to tune their instruments in 7-TET, including the Mandinka balafon.
 P5=720 (5-TET): The minor second has zero width, so the diatonic scale is a five-note whole tone scale. This is arguably the slendro scale of Java's gamelan orchestras, with which the gamelan's inharmonic timbres are maximally consonant.

Dynamic timbres
The partials of a pseudo-harmonic timbre are digitally mapped, as defined by a temperament, to specific notes of a pseudo-just tuning. When the temperament's generator changes in width, the tuning of the temperament's notes changes, and the partials change along with those notes—yet their relative position remains invariant on the temperament-generated isomorphic keyboard. The frequencies of notes and partials change with the generator's width, but the relationships among the notes, partials, and note-controlling buttons remain the same: as defined by the temperament. The mapping of partials to the notes of the syntonic temperament is animated in Video 5.

Dynamic tuning
On an isomorphic keyboard, any given musical structure—a scale, a chord, a chord progression, or an entire song—has exactly the same fingering in every tuning of a given temperament. This allows a performer to learn to play a song in one tuning of a given temperament and then to play it with exactly the same finger-movements, on exactly the same note-controlling buttons, in every other tuning of that temperament. See Video 3 (Same Shape).

For example, one could learn to play Rodgers and Hammerstein's Do-Re-Mi in its original 12-tone equal temperament (12-tet) and then play it with exactly the same finger-movements, on exactly the same note-controlling buttons, while smoothly changing the tuning in real time across the syntonic temperament's tuning continuum.

The process of digitally tempering a pseudo-harmonic timbre's partials to align with a tempered pseudo-just tuning's notes is shown in Video 6 (Dynamic tuning & timbre).

New musical effects
Dynamic Tonality enables two new kinds of real-time musical effects: 
 Tuning-based effects, that require a change in tuning, and 
 Timbre-based effects, that affect the distribution of energy among a pseudo-harmonic timbre's partials.

Tuning-based effects
Dynamic Tonality's novel tuning-based effects include:
 Polyphonic tuning bends, in which the pitch of the tonic remains fixed while the pitches of all other notes change to reflect changes in the tuning, with notes that are close to the tonic in tonal space changing pitch only slightly and those that are distant changing considerably;
 New chord progressions that start in a first tuning, change to second tuning (to progress across a comma which the second tuning tempers out but the first tuning does not), optionally change to subsequent tunings for similar reasons, and then conclude in the first tuning; and
 Temperament modulations, which start in a first tuning of a first temperament, change to a second tuning of the first temperament which is also a first tuning of a second temperament (a "pivot tuning"), change note-selection among enharmonics to reflect the second temperament, change to a second tuning of the second temperament, then optionally change to additional tunings and temperaments before returning through the pivot tuning to the first tuning of the first temperament.

Timbre-based effects
Dynamic Tonality's novel timbre effects include:
 Primeness: Partials 2, 4, 8, 16, ..., 2n are factorised only by prime 2, and so these partials can be said to embody twoness. Partials 3, 9, 27, ..., 3n are factorised only by prime 3, and so can be said to embody threeness. Partials 5, 25, 125, ..., 5n are factorised only by prime 5, and so can be said to embody fiveness. Other partials are factorised by two, or more, different primes. Partials 12 is factorised by both 2 and 3, and so embodies both twoness and threeness; partial 15 is factorised by 3 and 5, and so embodies both threeness and fiveness. Primeness empowers the musician to manipulate any given timbre such that its twoness, threeness, fiveness, ..., primeness can be enhanced or reduced. Adding a second comma to the syntonic temperament's comma sequence defines the 7th partial (see Video 5), thus similarly enabling sevenness.
 Conicality: Turning down twoness will lead to an odd-partial-only timbre – a “hollow or nasal” sound reminiscent of cylindrical closed bore instruments (e.g. clarinet). As the twoness is turned up, the even partials are gradually introduced creating a sound more reminiscent of open cylindrical bore instruments (e.g. flute, shakuhachi), or conical bore instruments (e.g. bassoon, oboe, saxophone). This perceptual feature is called conicality.
 Richness: When richness is at minimum, only the fundamental sounds; as it is increased, the twoness gain is increased, then the threeness gain, then the fiveness gain, etc..

Superset of static timbre paradigm
One can use Dynamic Tonality to temper only the tuning of notes, without tempering timbres, thus embracing the Static Timbre Paradigm.

Similarly, using a synthesizer control such as the Tone Diamond, a musician can opt to maximize regularity, harmonicity, or consonance—or trade off among them in real time (with some of the jammer's 10 degrees of freedom mapped to the Tone Diamond's variables), with consistent fingering. This enables musicians to choose tunings that are regular or irregular, equal or non-equal, major-biased or minor-biased—and enables the musician to slide smoothly among these tuning options in real time, exploring the emotional affect of each variation and the changes among them.

Compared to microtonality
Imagine that the valid tuning range of a temperament (as defined in Dynamic Tonality) is a string, and that individual tunings are beads on that string. The microtonal community has typically focused primarily on the beads, whereas Dynamic Tonality is focused primarily on the string. Both communities care about both beads and strings; only their focus and emphasis differ.

History
Dynamic Tonality was developed primarily by a collaboration between Prof. William Sethares, Dr. Andrew Milne, and James "Jim" Plamondon.

The latter formed Thumtronics Pty Ltd to develop an expressive, tiny, electronic Wicki-Hayden keyboard instrument: Thumtronics' "Thummer." The generic name for a Thummer-like instrument is "jammer." With two thumb-sticks and internal motion sensors, a jammer would afford 10 degrees of freedom, which would make it the most expressive polyphonic instrument available. Without the expressive potential of a jammer, musicians lack the expressive power needed to exploit Dynamic Tonality in real time, so Dynamic Tonality's new tonal frontiers remain largely unexplored.

References

Musical temperaments
Post-tonal music theory